The Lepidoptera of Belarus consist of both the butterflies and moths recorded from Belarus.

Butterflies

Hesperiidae
Carcharodus alceae (Esper, 1780)
Carcharodus floccifera (Zeller, 1847)
Carterocephalus palaemon (Pallas, 1771)
Carterocephalus silvicola (Meigen, 1829)
Erynnis tages (Linnaeus, 1758)
Hesperia comma (Linnaeus, 1758)
Heteropterus morpheus (Pallas, 1771)
Ochlodes sylvanus (Esper, 1777)
Pyrgus alveus (Hübner, 1803)
Pyrgus malvae (Linnaeus, 1758)
Thymelicus lineola (Ochsenheimer, 1808)
Thymelicus sylvestris (Poda, 1761)

Lycaenidae
Agriades optilete (Knoch, 1781)
Aricia agestis (Denis & Schiffermüller, 1775)
Aricia artaxerxes (Fabricius, 1793)
Callophrys rubi (Linnaeus, 1758)
Celastrina argiolus (Linnaeus, 1758)
Cupido minimus (Fuessly, 1775)
Cupido argiades (Pallas, 1771)
Cyaniris semiargus (Rottemburg, 1775)
Eumedonia eumedon (Esper, 1780)
Favonius quercus (Linnaeus, 1758)
Glaucopsyche alexis (Poda, 1761)
Lycaena alciphron (Rottemburg, 1775)
Lycaena dispar (Haworth, 1802)
Lycaena helle (Denis & Schiffermüller, 1775)
Lycaena hippothoe (Linnaeus, 1761)
Lycaena phlaeas (Linnaeus, 1761)
Lycaena tityrus (Poda, 1761)
Lycaena virgaureae (Linnaeus, 1758)
Phengaris alcon (Denis & Schiffermüller, 1775)
Phengaris arion (Linnaeus, 1758)
Phengaris nausithous (Bergstrasser, 1779)
Plebejus argus (Linnaeus, 1758)
Plebejus argyrognomon (Bergstrasser, 1779)
Plebejus idas (Linnaeus, 1761)
Polyommatus amandus (Schneider, 1792)
Polyommatus icarus (Rottemburg, 1775)
Satyrium ilicis (Esper, 1779)
Satyrium spini (Denis & Schiffermüller, 1775)
Satyrium w-album (Knoch, 1782)
Thecla betulae (Linnaeus, 1758)

Nymphalidae
Aglais io (Linnaeus, 1758)
Aglais urticae (Linnaeus, 1758)
Apatura ilia (Denis & Schiffermüller, 1775)
Apatura iris (Linnaeus, 1758)
Aphantopus hyperantus (Linnaeus, 1758)
Araschnia levana (Linnaeus, 1758)
Argynnis paphia (Linnaeus, 1758)
Argynnis laodice (Pallas, 1771)
Boloria aquilonaris (Stichel, 1908)
Boloria dia (Linnaeus, 1767)
Boloria euphrosyne (Linnaeus, 1758)
Boloria selene (Denis & Schiffermüller, 1775)
Boloria eunomia (Esper, 1799)
Brenthis ino (Rottemburg, 1775)
Coenonympha arcania (Linnaeus, 1761)
Coenonympha glycerion (Borkhausen, 1788)
Coenonympha hero (Linnaeus, 1761)
Coenonympha pamphilus (Linnaeus, 1758)
Coenonympha tullia (Muller, 1764)
Erebia ligea (Linnaeus, 1758)
Erebia medusa (Denis & Schiffermüller, 1775)
Euphydryas aurinia (Rottemburg, 1775)
Euphydryas maturna (Linnaeus, 1758)
Fabriciana adippe (Denis & Schiffermüller, 1775)
Fabriciana niobe (Linnaeus, 1758)
Hipparchia semele (Linnaeus, 1758)
Hyponephele lycaon (Rottemburg, 1775)
Issoria lathonia (Linnaeus, 1758)
Lasiommata maera (Linnaeus, 1758)
Lasiommata megera (Linnaeus, 1767)
Limenitis camilla (Linnaeus, 1764)
Limenitis populi (Linnaeus, 1758)
Lopinga achine (Scopoli, 1763)
Maniola jurtina (Linnaeus, 1758)
Melanargia galathea (Linnaeus, 1758)
Melitaea athalia (Rottemburg, 1775)
Melitaea aurelia Nickerl, 1850
Melitaea cinxia (Linnaeus, 1758)
Melitaea diamina (Lang, 1789)
Melitaea didyma (Esper, 1778)
Melitaea phoebe (Denis & Schiffermüller, 1775)
Nymphalis antiopa (Linnaeus, 1758)
Nymphalis polychloros (Linnaeus, 1758)
Oeneis jutta (Hübner, 1806)
Pararge aegeria (Linnaeus, 1758)
Polygonia c-album (Linnaeus, 1758)
Speyeria aglaja (Linnaeus, 1758)
Vanessa atalanta (Linnaeus, 1758)
Vanessa cardui (Linnaeus, 1758)

Papilionidae
Papilio machaon Linnaeus, 1758
Parnassius mnemosyne (Linnaeus, 1758)
 Zerynthia polyxena

Pieridae
Anthocharis cardamines (Linnaeus, 1758)
Aporia crataegi (Linnaeus, 1758)
Colias croceus (Fourcroy, 1785)
Colias hyale (Linnaeus, 1758)
Colias myrmidone (Esper, 1781)
Colias palaeno (Linnaeus, 1761)
Gonepteryx rhamni (Linnaeus, 1758)
Leptidea sinapis (Linnaeus, 1758)
Pieris brassicae (Linnaeus, 1758)
Pieris napi (Linnaeus, 1758)
Pieris rapae (Linnaeus, 1758)
Pontia edusa (Fabricius, 1777)

Moths

Adelidae
Adela croesella (Scopoli, 1763)
Adela reaumurella (Linnaeus, 1758)
Nemophora degeerella (Linnaeus, 1758)
Nemophora dumerilella (Duponchel, 1839)

Alucitidae
Alucita hexadactyla Linnaeus, 1758

Argyresthiidae
Argyresthia brockeella (Hübner, 1813)
Argyresthia conjugella Zeller, 1839
Argyresthia curvella (Linnaeus, 1761)
Argyresthia goedartella (Linnaeus, 1758)
Argyresthia pruniella (Clerck, 1759)
Argyresthia pygmaeella (Denis & Schiffermüller, 1775)
Argyresthia retinella Zeller, 1839
Argyresthia semifusca (Haworth, 1828)
Argyresthia spinosella Stainton, 1849
Argyresthia glabratella (Zeller, 1847)
Argyresthia illuminatella Zeller, 1839

Batrachedridae
Batrachedra pinicolella (Zeller, 1839)
Batrachedra praeangusta (Haworth, 1828)

Bedelliidae
Bedellia somnulentella (Zeller, 1847)

Blastobasidae
Hypatopa binotella (Thunberg, 1794)
Hypatopa inunctella Zeller, 1839

Brahmaeidae
Lemonia dumi (Linnaeus, 1761)

Bucculatricidae
Bucculatrix albedinella (Zeller, 1839)
Bucculatrix artemisiella Herrich-Schäffer, 1855
Bucculatrix bechsteinella (Bechstein & Scharfenberg, 1805)
Bucculatrix cidarella (Zeller, 1839)
Bucculatrix cristatella (Zeller, 1839)
Bucculatrix demaryella (Duponchel, 1840)
Bucculatrix frangutella (Goeze, 1783)
Bucculatrix gnaphaliella (Treitschke, 1833)
Bucculatrix ratisbonensis Stainton, 1861
Bucculatrix thoracella (Thunberg, 1794)
Bucculatrix ulmella Zeller, 1848

Chimabachidae
Diurnea fagella (Denis & Schiffermüller, 1775)
Diurnea lipsiella (Denis & Schiffermüller, 1775)

Choreutidae
Anthophila fabriciana (Linnaeus, 1767)
Choreutis pariana (Clerck, 1759)
Tebenna bjerkandrella (Thunberg, 1784)

Cosmopterigidae
Cosmopterix lienigiella Zeller, 1846
Cosmopterix orichalcea Stainton, 1861
Cosmopterix zieglerella (Hübner, 1810)
Eteobalea anonymella (Riedl, 1965)
Limnaecia phragmitella Stainton, 1851
Pancalia leuwenhoekella (Linnaeus, 1761)
Pancalia schwarzella (Fabricius, 1798)
Sorhagenia rhamniella (Zeller, 1839)

Cossidae
Acossus terebra (Denis & Schiffermüller, 1775)
Cossus cossus (Linnaeus, 1758)
Phragmataecia castaneae (Hübner, 1790)
Zeuzera pyrina (Linnaeus, 1761)

Crambidae
Acentria ephemerella (Denis & Schiffermüller, 1775)
Agriphila aeneociliella (Eversmann, 1844)
Agriphila latistria (Haworth, 1811)
Agriphila poliellus (Treitschke, 1832)
Agrotera nemoralis (Scopoli, 1763)
Anania luctualis (Hübner, 1793)
Anania perlucidalis (Hübner, 1809)
Anania stachydalis (Germar, 1821)
Atralata albofascialis (Treitschke, 1829)
Cataclysta lemnata (Linnaeus, 1758)
Catoptria falsella (Denis & Schiffermüller, 1775)
Catoptria fulgidella (Hübner, 1813)
Catoptria lythargyrella (Hübner, 1796)
Catoptria margaritella (Denis & Schiffermüller, 1775)
Catoptria permutatellus (Herrich-Schäffer, 1848)
Catoptria verellus (Zincken, 1817)
Crambus ericella (Hübner, 1813)
Crambus heringiellus Herrich-Schäffer, 1848
Crambus uliginosellus Zeller, 1850
Cynaeda dentalis (Denis & Schiffermüller, 1775)
Donacaula forficella (Thunberg, 1794)
Donacaula mucronella (Denis & Schiffermüller, 1775)
Ecpyrrhorrhoe rubiginalis (Hübner, 1796)
Elophila nymphaeata (Linnaeus, 1758)
Eudonia laetella (Zeller, 1846)
Eudonia mercurella (Linnaeus, 1758)
Eudonia murana (Curtis, 1827)
Eudonia pallida (Curtis, 1827)
Eudonia truncicolella (Stainton, 1849)
Eurrhypis pollinalis (Denis & Schiffermüller, 1775)
Evergestis aenealis (Denis & Schiffermüller, 1775)
Evergestis extimalis (Scopoli, 1763)
Evergestis forficalis (Linnaeus, 1758)
Evergestis frumentalis (Linnaeus, 1761)
Evergestis pallidata (Hufnagel, 1767)
Heliothela wulfeniana (Scopoli, 1763)
Nymphula nitidulata (Hufnagel, 1767)
Ostrinia palustralis (Hübner, 1796)
Paracorsia repandalis (Denis & Schiffermüller, 1775)
Parapoynx stratiotata (Linnaeus, 1758)
Paratalanta hyalinalis (Hübner, 1796)
Pediasia luteella (Denis & Schiffermüller, 1775)
Pleuroptya ruralis (Scopoli, 1763)
Pyrausta aerealis (Hübner, 1793)
Pyrausta aurata (Scopoli, 1763)
Pyrausta ostrinalis (Hübner, 1796)
Sclerocona acutella (Eversmann, 1842)
Scoparia ambigualis (Treitschke, 1829)
Scoparia ancipitella (La Harpe, 1855)
Scoparia basistrigalis Knaggs, 1866
Scoparia pyralella (Denis & Schiffermüller, 1775)
Scoparia subfusca Haworth, 1811
Titanio normalis (Hübner, 1796)
Udea accolalis (Zeller, 1867)
Udea decrepitalis (Herrich-Schäffer, 1848)
Udea ferrugalis (Hübner, 1796)
Udea fulvalis (Hübner, 1809)
Udea hamalis (Thunberg, 1788)
Uresiphita gilvata (Fabricius, 1794)
Xanthocrambus saxonellus (Zincken, 1821)

Douglasiidae
Klimeschia transversella (Zeller, 1839)
Tinagma perdicella Zeller, 1839

Drepanidae
Achlya flavicornis (Linnaeus, 1758)
Cilix glaucata (Scopoli, 1763)
Drepana curvatula (Borkhausen, 1790)
Drepana falcataria (Linnaeus, 1758)
Falcaria lacertinaria (Linnaeus, 1758)
Habrosyne pyritoides (Hufnagel, 1766)
Ochropacha duplaris (Linnaeus, 1761)
Polyploca ridens (Fabricius, 1787)
Sabra harpagula (Esper, 1786)
Tethea ocularis (Linnaeus, 1767)
Tethea or (Denis & Schiffermüller, 1775)
Tetheella fluctuosa (Hübner, 1803)
Thyatira batis (Linnaeus, 1758)
Watsonalla cultraria (Fabricius, 1775)

Elachistidae
Agonopterix alstromeriana (Clerck, 1759)
Agonopterix angelicella (Hübner, 1813)
Agonopterix arenella (Denis & Schiffermüller, 1775)
Agonopterix ciliella (Stainton, 1849)
Agonopterix conterminella (Zeller, 1839)
Agonopterix heracliana (Linnaeus, 1758)
Agonopterix hypericella (Hübner, 1817)
Agonopterix kaekeritziana (Linnaeus, 1767)
Agonopterix laterella (Denis & Schiffermüller, 1775)
Agonopterix liturosa (Haworth, 1811)
Agonopterix multiplicella (Erschoff, 1877)
Agonopterix ocellana (Fabricius, 1775)
Agonopterix propinquella (Treitschke, 1835)
Agonopterix purpurea (Haworth, 1811)
Anchinia daphnella (Denis & Schiffermüller, 1775)
Blastodacna atra (Haworth, 1828)
Chrysoclista linneella (Clerck, 1759)
Depressaria badiella (Hübner, 1796)
Depressaria chaerophylli Zeller, 1839
Depressaria daucella (Denis & Schiffermüller, 1775)
Depressaria depressana (Fabricius, 1775)
Depressaria emeritella Stainton, 1849
Depressaria leucocephala Snellen, 1884
Depressaria olerella Zeller, 1854
Depressaria pimpinellae Zeller, 1839
Depressaria pulcherrimella Stainton, 1849
Depressaria radiella (Goeze, 1783)
Depressaria sordidatella Tengstrom, 1848
Depressaria ultimella Stainton, 1849
Ethmia bipunctella (Fabricius, 1775)
Ethmia pusiella (Linnaeus, 1758)
Ethmia quadrillella (Goeze, 1783)
Ethmia terminella T. B. Fletcher, 1938
Exaeretia ciniflonella (Lienig & Zeller, 1846)
Exaeretia allisella Stainton, 1849
Heinemannia laspeyrella (Hübner, 1796)
Hypercallia citrinalis (Scopoli, 1763)
Semioscopis avellanella (Hübner, 1793)
Semioscopis oculella (Thunberg, 1794)
Semioscopis steinkellneriana (Denis & Schiffermüller, 1775)
Semioscopis strigulana (Denis & Schiffermüller, 1775)

Endromidae
Endromis versicolora (Linnaeus, 1758)

Epermeniidae
Epermenia chaerophyllella (Goeze, 1783)
Epermenia illigerella (Hübner, 1813)
Ochromolopis ictella (Hübner, 1813)

Erebidae
Amata phegea (Linnaeus, 1758)
Arctia caja (Linnaeus, 1758)
Arctia festiva (Hufnagel, 1766)
Arctia villica (Linnaeus, 1758)
Arctornis l-nigrum (Muller, 1764)
Atolmis rubricollis (Linnaeus, 1758)
Autophila asiatica (Staudinger, 1888)
Autophila dilucida (Hübner, 1808)
Autophila limbata (Staudinger, 1871)
Callimorpha dominula (Linnaeus, 1758)
Calliteara pudibunda (Linnaeus, 1758)
Calyptra thalictri (Borkhausen, 1790)
Catephia alchymista (Denis & Schiffermüller, 1775)
Catocala adultera Menetries, 1856
Catocala fraxini (Linnaeus, 1758)
Catocala fulminea (Scopoli, 1763)
Catocala nupta (Linnaeus, 1767)
Catocala nymphagoga (Esper, 1787)
Catocala pacta (Linnaeus, 1758)
Catocala promissa (Denis & Schiffermüller, 1775)
Catocala sponsa (Linnaeus, 1767)
Colobochyla salicalis (Denis & Schiffermüller, 1775)
Coscinia cribraria (Linnaeus, 1758)
Coscinia striata (Linnaeus, 1758)
Cybosia mesomella (Linnaeus, 1758)
Diacrisia sannio (Linnaeus, 1758)
Diaphora mendica (Clerck, 1759)
Dicallomera fascelina (Linnaeus, 1758)
Dysgonia algira (Linnaeus, 1767)
Eilema complana (Linnaeus, 1758)
Eilema depressa (Esper, 1787)
Eilema griseola (Hübner, 1803)
Eilema lurideola (Zincken, 1817)
Eilema lutarella (Linnaeus, 1758)
Eilema palliatella (Scopoli, 1763)
Eilema pygmaeola (Doubleday, 1847)
Eilema sororcula (Hufnagel, 1766)
Eublemma minutata (Fabricius, 1794)
Euclidia mi (Clerck, 1759)
Euclidia glyphica (Linnaeus, 1758)
Euplagia quadripunctaria (Poda, 1761)
Euproctis chrysorrhoea (Linnaeus, 1758)
Euproctis similis (Fuessly, 1775)
Grammodes stolida (Fabricius, 1775)
Gynaephora selenitica (Esper, 1789)
Herminia grisealis (Denis & Schiffermüller, 1775)
Herminia tarsicrinalis (Knoch, 1782)
Herminia tarsipennalis (Treitschke, 1835)
Hypena crassalis (Fabricius, 1787)
Hypena proboscidalis (Linnaeus, 1758)
Hypena rostralis (Linnaeus, 1758)
Hypenodes humidalis Doubleday, 1850
Hyphoraia aulica (Linnaeus, 1758)
Idia calvaria (Denis & Schiffermüller, 1775)
Laelia coenosa (Hübner, 1808)
Laspeyria flexula (Denis & Schiffermüller, 1775)
Leucoma salicis (Linnaeus, 1758)
Lithosia quadra (Linnaeus, 1758)
Lygephila craccae (Denis & Schiffermüller, 1775)
Lygephila pastinum (Treitschke, 1826)
Lygephila procax (Hübner, 1813)
Lygephila viciae (Hübner, 1822)
Lymantria dispar (Linnaeus, 1758)
Lymantria monacha (Linnaeus, 1758)
Macrochilo cribrumalis (Hübner, 1793)
Miltochrista miniata (Forster, 1771)
Minucia lunaris (Denis & Schiffermüller, 1775)
Nudaria mundana (Linnaeus, 1761)
Orgyia antiquoides (Hübner, 1822)
Orgyia recens (Hübner, 1819)
Orgyia antiqua (Linnaeus, 1758)
Paracolax tristalis (Fabricius, 1794)
Parascotia fuliginaria (Linnaeus, 1761)
Parasemia plantaginis (Linnaeus, 1758)
Pechipogo plumigeralis Hübner, 1825
Pechipogo strigilata (Linnaeus, 1758)
Pelosia muscerda (Hufnagel, 1766)
Pericallia matronula (Linnaeus, 1758)
Phragmatobia fuliginosa (Linnaeus, 1758)
Phragmatobia luctifera (Denis & Schiffermüller, 1775)
Phytometra viridaria (Clerck, 1759)
Polypogon gryphalis (Herrich-Schäffer, 1851)
Polypogon tentacularia (Linnaeus, 1758)
Rhyparia purpurata (Linnaeus, 1758)
Rivula sericealis (Scopoli, 1763)
Schrankia costaestrigalis (Stephens, 1834)
Schrankia taenialis (Hübner, 1809)
Scoliopteryx libatrix (Linnaeus, 1758)
Setina irrorella (Linnaeus, 1758)
Simplicia rectalis (Eversmann, 1842)
Spilosoma lubricipeda (Linnaeus, 1758)
Spilosoma lutea (Hufnagel, 1766)
Spilosoma urticae (Esper, 1789)
Thumatha senex (Hübner, 1808)
Tyria jacobaeae (Linnaeus, 1758)
Utetheisa pulchella (Linnaeus, 1758)
Zanclognatha lunalis (Scopoli, 1763)
Zanclognatha zelleralis (Wocke, 1850)

Eriocraniidae
Eriocrania semipurpurella (Stephens, 1835)
Eriocrania sparrmannella (Bosc, 1791)

Gelechiidae
Acompsia cinerella (Clerck, 1759)
Altenia perspersella (Wocke, 1862)
Altenia scriptella (Hübner, 1796)
Anacampsis blattariella (Hübner, 1796)
Anacampsis populella (Clerck, 1759)
Anacampsis temerella (Lienig & Zeller, 1846)
Anarsia lineatella Zeller, 1839
Aproaerema anthyllidella (Hübner, 1813)
Argolamprotes micella (Denis & Schiffermüller, 1775)
Aristotelia brizella (Treitschke, 1833)
Aristotelia ericinella (Zeller, 1839)
Aroga velocella (Duponchel, 1838)
Athrips mouffetella (Linnaeus, 1758)
Athrips pruinosella (Lienig & Zeller, 1846)
Brachmia blandella (Fabricius, 1798)
Brachmia dimidiella (Denis & Schiffermüller, 1775)
Bryotropha desertella (Douglas, 1850)
Bryotropha galbanella (Zeller, 1839)
Bryotropha plantariella (Tengstrom, 1848)
Bryotropha senectella (Zeller, 1839)
Bryotropha similis (Stainton, 1854)
Bryotropha terrella (Denis & Schiffermüller, 1775)
Carpatolechia alburnella (Zeller, 1839)
Carpatolechia fugitivella (Zeller, 1839)
Carpatolechia notatella (Hübner, 1813)
Carpatolechia proximella (Hübner, 1796)
Caryocolum blandella (Douglas, 1852)
Caryocolum cassella (Walker, 1864)
Caryocolum fischerella (Treitschke, 1833)
Caryocolum kroesmanniella (Herrich-Schäffer, 1854)
Caryocolum tricolorella (Haworth, 1812)
Caryocolum vicinella (Douglas, 1851)
Chionodes continuella (Zeller, 1839)
Chionodes distinctella (Zeller, 1839)
Chionodes electella (Zeller, 1839)
Chionodes fumatella (Douglas, 1850)
Chrysoesthia drurella (Fabricius, 1775)
Chrysoesthia sexguttella (Thunberg, 1794)
Cosmardia moritzella (Treitschke, 1835)
Dichomeris alacella (Zeller, 1839)
Dichomeris derasella (Denis & Schiffermüller, 1775)
Dichomeris juniperella (Linnaeus, 1761)
Dichomeris limosellus (Schlager, 1849)
Dichomeris rasilella (Herrich-Schäffer, 1854)
Dichomeris ustalella (Fabricius, 1794)
Eulamprotes atrella (Denis & Schiffermüller, 1775)
Eulamprotes superbella (Zeller, 1839)
Eulamprotes unicolorella (Duponchel, 1843)
Eulamprotes wilkella (Linnaeus, 1758)
Exoteleia dodecella (Linnaeus, 1758)
Filatima incomptella (Herrich-Schäffer, 1854)
Gelechia cuneatella Douglas, 1852
Gelechia hippophaella (Schrank, 1802)
Gelechia jakovlevi Krulikovsky, 1905
Gelechia muscosella Zeller, 1839
Gelechia nigra (Haworth, 1828)
Gelechia rhombella (Denis & Schiffermüller, 1775)
Gelechia rhombelliformis Staudinger, 1871
Gelechia sabinellus (Zeller, 1839)
Gelechia scotinella Herrich-Schäffer, 1854
Gelechia sestertiella Herrich-Schäffer, 1854
Gelechia sororculella (Hübner, 1817)
Gelechia turpella (Denis & Schiffermüller, 1775)
Gelechia sirotina Omelko, 1986
Gnorimoschema epithymella (Staudinger, 1859)
Helcystogramma lineolella (Zeller, 1839)
Helcystogramma rufescens (Haworth, 1828)
Hypatima rhomboidella (Linnaeus, 1758)
Isophrictis striatella (Denis & Schiffermüller, 1775)
Metzneria aestivella (Zeller, 1839)
Metzneria ehikeella Gozmany, 1954
Metzneria lappella (Linnaeus, 1758)
Metzneria metzneriella (Stainton, 1851)
Metzneria neuropterella (Zeller, 1839)
Mirificarma mulinella (Zeller, 1839)
Monochroa cytisella (Curtis, 1837)
Monochroa elongella (Heinemann, 1870)
Monochroa ferrea (Frey, 1870)
Monochroa hornigi (Staudinger, 1883)
Monochroa sepicolella (Herrich-Schäffer, 1854)
Monochroa simplicella (Lienig & Zeller, 1846)
Monochroa suffusella (Douglas, 1850)
Monochroa tenebrella (Hübner, 1817)
Neofaculta ericetella (Geyer, 1832)
Neofaculta infernella (Herrich-Schäffer, 1854)
Neofriseria peliella (Treitschke, 1835)
Neofriseria singula (Staudinger, 1876)
Parachronistis albiceps (Zeller, 1839)
Pexicopia malvella (Hübner, 1805)
Prolita sexpunctella (Fabricius, 1794)
Pseudotelphusa paripunctella (Thunberg, 1794)
Pseudotelphusa scalella (Scopoli, 1763)
Psoricoptera gibbosella (Zeller, 1839)
Ptocheuusa inopella (Zeller, 1839)
Recurvaria leucatella (Clerck, 1759)
Recurvaria nanella (Denis & Schiffermüller, 1775)
Scrobipalpa acuminatella (Sircom, 1850)
Scrobipalpa artemisiella (Treitschke, 1833)
Scrobipalpa atriplicella (Fischer von Röslerstamm, 1841)
Scrobipalpa clintoni Povolny, 1968
Scrobipalpa murinella (Duponchel, 1843)
Scrobipalpa obsoletella (Fischer von Röslerstamm, 1841)
Scrobipalpa pauperella (Heinemann, 1870)
Scrobipalpa proclivella (Fuchs, 1886)
Scrobipalpula psilella (Herrich-Schäffer, 1854)
Sitotroga cerealella (Olivier, 1789)
Sophronia chilonella (Treitschke, 1833)
Sophronia humerella (Denis & Schiffermüller, 1775)
Sophronia semicostella (Hübner, 1813)
Sophronia sicariellus (Zeller, 1839)
Stenolechia gemmella (Linnaeus, 1758)
Syncopacma cinctella (Clerck, 1759)
Teleiodes flavimaculella (Herrich-Schäffer, 1854)
Teleiodes luculella (Hübner, 1813)
Teleiodes wagae (Nowicki, 1860)
Teleiopsis diffinis (Haworth, 1828)
Thiotricha subocellea (Stephens, 1834)

Geometridae
Abraxas grossulariata (Linnaeus, 1758)
Abraxas sylvata (Scopoli, 1763)
Acasis viretata (Hübner, 1799)
Aethalura punctulata (Denis & Schiffermüller, 1775)
Agriopis leucophaearia (Denis & Schiffermüller, 1775)
Agriopis marginaria (Fabricius, 1776)
Alcis jubata (Thunberg, 1788)
Alcis repandata (Linnaeus, 1758)
Alsophila aceraria (Denis & Schiffermüller, 1775)
Alsophila aescularia (Denis & Schiffermüller, 1775)
Angerona prunaria (Linnaeus, 1758)
Anticollix sparsata (Treitschke, 1828)
Apeira syringaria (Linnaeus, 1758)
Aplocera efformata (Guenee, 1858)
Aplocera plagiata (Linnaeus, 1758)
Archiearis parthenias (Linnaeus, 1761)
Arichanna melanaria (Linnaeus, 1758)
Ascotis selenaria (Denis & Schiffermüller, 1775)
Aspitates gilvaria (Denis & Schiffermüller, 1775)
Asthena albulata (Hufnagel, 1767)
Asthena anseraria (Herrich-Schäffer, 1855)
Baptria tibiale (Esper, 1791)
Biston betularia (Linnaeus, 1758)
Biston strataria (Hufnagel, 1767)
Boudinotiana notha (Hübner, 1803)
Bupalus piniaria (Linnaeus, 1758)
Cabera exanthemata (Scopoli, 1763)
Cabera pusaria (Linnaeus, 1758)
Campaea margaritaria (Linnaeus, 1761)
Camptogramma bilineata (Linnaeus, 1758)
Carsia sororiata (Hübner, 1813)
Catarhoe cuculata (Hufnagel, 1767)
Cepphis advenaria (Hübner, 1790)
Chariaspilates formosaria (Eversmann, 1837)
Chiasmia clathrata (Linnaeus, 1758)
Chlorissa cloraria (Hübner, 1813)
Chlorissa viridata (Linnaeus, 1758)
Chloroclysta siterata (Hufnagel, 1767)
Chloroclystis v-ata (Haworth, 1809)
Cleora cinctaria (Denis & Schiffermüller, 1775)
Cleorodes lichenaria (Hufnagel, 1767)
Colostygia pectinataria (Knoch, 1781)
Colotois pennaria (Linnaeus, 1761)
Comibaena bajularia (Denis & Schiffermüller, 1775)
Cosmorhoe ocellata (Linnaeus, 1758)
Costaconvexa polygrammata (Borkhausen, 1794)
Crocallis elinguaria (Linnaeus, 1758)
Cyclophora linearia (Hübner, 1799)
Cyclophora porata (Linnaeus, 1767)
Cyclophora punctaria (Linnaeus, 1758)
Cyclophora albipunctata (Hufnagel, 1767)
Cyclophora annularia (Fabricius, 1775)
Cyclophora pendularia (Clerck, 1759)
Cyclophora quercimontaria (Bastelberger, 1897)
Deileptenia ribeata (Clerck, 1759)
Dysstroma citrata (Linnaeus, 1761)
Dysstroma truncata (Hufnagel, 1767)
Ecliptopera capitata (Herrich-Schäffer, 1839)
Ecliptopera silaceata (Denis & Schiffermüller, 1775)
Ectropis crepuscularia (Denis & Schiffermüller, 1775)
Electrophaes corylata (Thunberg, 1792)
Ematurga atomaria (Linnaeus, 1758)
Ennomos alniaria (Linnaeus, 1758)
Ennomos autumnaria (Werneburg, 1859)
Ennomos erosaria (Denis & Schiffermüller, 1775)
Ennomos fuscantaria (Haworth, 1809)
Ennomos quercinaria (Hufnagel, 1767)
Epione repandaria (Hufnagel, 1767)
Epione vespertaria (Linnaeus, 1767)
Epirranthis diversata (Denis & Schiffermüller, 1775)
Epirrhoe alternata (Muller, 1764)
Epirrhoe galiata (Denis & Schiffermüller, 1775)
Epirrhoe hastulata (Hübner, 1790)
Epirrhoe rivata (Hübner, 1813)
Epirrhoe tristata (Linnaeus, 1758)
Epirrita autumnata (Borkhausen, 1794)
Epirrita dilutata (Denis & Schiffermüller, 1775)
Erannis defoliaria (Clerck, 1759)
Euchoeca nebulata (Scopoli, 1763)
Eulithis mellinata (Fabricius, 1787)
Eulithis populata (Linnaeus, 1758)
Eulithis prunata (Linnaeus, 1758)
Eulithis pyropata (Hübner, 1809)
Eulithis testata (Linnaeus, 1761)
Euphyia biangulata (Haworth, 1809)
Euphyia unangulata (Haworth, 1809)
Eupithecia abietaria (Goeze, 1781)
Eupithecia absinthiata (Clerck, 1759)
Eupithecia analoga Djakonov, 1926
Eupithecia assimilata Doubleday, 1856
Eupithecia cauchiata (Duponchel, 1831)
Eupithecia centaureata (Denis & Schiffermüller, 1775)
Eupithecia conterminata (Lienig, 1846)
Eupithecia denotata (Hübner, 1813)
Eupithecia egenaria Herrich-Schäffer, 1848
Eupithecia exiguata (Hübner, 1813)
Eupithecia extraversaria Herrich-Schäffer, 1852
Eupithecia gelidata Moschler, 1860
Eupithecia icterata (de Villers, 1789)
Eupithecia indigata (Hübner, 1813)
Eupithecia innotata (Hufnagel, 1767)
Eupithecia intricata (Zetterstedt, 1839)
Eupithecia lanceata (Hübner, 1825)
Eupithecia lariciata (Freyer, 1841)
Eupithecia linariata (Denis & Schiffermüller, 1775)
Eupithecia millefoliata Rossler, 1866
Eupithecia nanata (Hübner, 1813)
Eupithecia ochridata Schutze & Pinker, 1968
Eupithecia pimpinellata (Hübner, 1813)
Eupithecia plumbeolata (Haworth, 1809)
Eupithecia pusillata (Denis & Schiffermüller, 1775)
Eupithecia pygmaeata (Hübner, 1799)
Eupithecia satyrata (Hübner, 1813)
Eupithecia simpliciata (Haworth, 1809)
Eupithecia sinuosaria (Eversmann, 1848)
Eupithecia subfuscata (Haworth, 1809)
Eupithecia subumbrata (Denis & Schiffermüller, 1775)
Eupithecia succenturiata (Linnaeus, 1758)
Eupithecia tantillaria Boisduval, 1840
Eupithecia tenuiata (Hübner, 1813)
Eupithecia tripunctaria Herrich-Schäffer, 1852
Eupithecia trisignaria Herrich-Schäffer, 1848
Eupithecia valerianata (Hübner, 1813)
Eupithecia venosata (Fabricius, 1787)
Eupithecia virgaureata Doubleday, 1861
Eupithecia vulgata (Haworth, 1809)
Eustroma reticulata (Denis & Schiffermüller, 1775)
Gagitodes sagittata (Fabricius, 1787)
Gandaritis pyraliata (Denis & Schiffermüller, 1775)
Geometra papilionaria (Linnaeus, 1758)
Gymnoscelis rufifasciata (Haworth, 1809)
Hemistola chrysoprasaria (Esper, 1795)
Hemithea aestivaria (Hübner, 1789)
Horisme tersata (Denis & Schiffermüller, 1775)
Horisme vitalbata (Denis & Schiffermüller, 1775)
Hydrelia flammeolaria (Hufnagel, 1767)
Hydrelia sylvata (Denis & Schiffermüller, 1775)
Hydria cervinalis (Scopoli, 1763)
Hydria undulata (Linnaeus, 1758)
Hydriomena furcata (Thunberg, 1784)
Hydriomena impluviata (Denis & Schiffermüller, 1775)
Hydriomena ruberata (Freyer, 1831)
Hylaea fasciaria (Linnaeus, 1758)
Hypomecis roboraria (Denis & Schiffermüller, 1775)
Idaea aversata (Linnaeus, 1758)
Idaea biselata (Hufnagel, 1767)
Idaea degeneraria (Hübner, 1799)
Idaea deversaria (Herrich-Schäffer, 1847)
Idaea dimidiata (Hufnagel, 1767)
Idaea emarginata (Linnaeus, 1758)
Idaea fuscovenosa (Goeze, 1781)
Idaea humiliata (Hufnagel, 1767)
Idaea moniliata (Denis & Schiffermüller, 1775)
Idaea muricata (Hufnagel, 1767)
Idaea ochrata (Scopoli, 1763)
Idaea pallidata (Denis & Schiffermüller, 1775)
Idaea seriata (Schrank, 1802)
Idaea serpentata (Hufnagel, 1767)
Idaea straminata (Borkhausen, 1794)
Idaea sylvestraria (Hübner, 1799)
Jodis lactearia (Linnaeus, 1758)
Jodis putata (Linnaeus, 1758)
Lampropteryx otregiata (Metcalfe, 1917)
Lampropteryx suffumata (Denis & Schiffermüller, 1775)
Larentia clavaria (Haworth, 1809)
Ligdia adustata (Denis & Schiffermüller, 1775)
Lithostege farinata (Hufnagel, 1767)
Lithostege griseata (Denis & Schiffermüller, 1775)
Lobophora halterata (Hufnagel, 1767)
Lomaspilis marginata (Linnaeus, 1758)
Lomographa bimaculata (Fabricius, 1775)
Lomographa temerata (Denis & Schiffermüller, 1775)
Lycia hirtaria (Clerck, 1759)
Lycia pomonaria (Hübner, 1790)
Lythria cruentaria (Hufnagel, 1767)
Lythria purpuraria (Linnaeus, 1758)
Macaria alternata (Denis & Schiffermüller, 1775)
Macaria artesiaria (Denis & Schiffermüller, 1775)
Macaria brunneata (Thunberg, 1784)
Macaria liturata (Clerck, 1759)
Macaria notata (Linnaeus, 1758)
Macaria signaria (Hübner, 1809)
Macaria wauaria (Linnaeus, 1758)
Martania taeniata (Stephens, 1831)
Melanthia procellata (Denis & Schiffermüller, 1775)
Mesoleuca albicillata (Linnaeus, 1758)
Mesotype didymata (Linnaeus, 1758)
Mesotype parallelolineata (Retzius, 1783)
Minoa murinata (Scopoli, 1763)
Narraga fasciolaria (Hufnagel, 1767)
Nycterosea obstipata (Fabricius, 1794)
Odezia atrata (Linnaeus, 1758)
Odontopera bidentata (Clerck, 1759)
Operophtera brumata (Linnaeus, 1758)
Operophtera fagata (Scharfenberg, 1805)
Opisthograptis luteolata (Linnaeus, 1758)
Orthonama vittata (Borkhausen, 1794)
Ourapteryx sambucaria (Linnaeus, 1758)
Paradarisa consonaria (Hübner, 1799)
Parectropis similaria (Hufnagel, 1767)
Pasiphila chloerata (Mabille, 1870)
Pasiphila debiliata (Hübner, 1817)
Pasiphila rectangulata (Linnaeus, 1758)
Pelurga comitata (Linnaeus, 1758)
Pennithera firmata (Hübner, 1822)
Perconia strigillaria (Hübner, 1787)
Peribatodes rhomboidaria (Denis & Schiffermüller, 1775)
Perizoma affinitata (Stephens, 1831)
Perizoma albulata (Denis & Schiffermüller, 1775)
Perizoma alchemillata (Linnaeus, 1758)
Perizoma bifaciata (Haworth, 1809)
Perizoma blandiata (Denis & Schiffermüller, 1775)
Perizoma flavofasciata (Thunberg, 1792)
Perizoma hydrata (Treitschke, 1829)
Perizoma minorata (Treitschke, 1828)
Petrophora chlorosata (Scopoli, 1763)
Phibalapteryx virgata (Hufnagel, 1767)
Phigalia pilosaria (Denis & Schiffermüller, 1775)
Philereme transversata (Hufnagel, 1767)
Philereme vetulata (Denis & Schiffermüller, 1775)
Plagodis dolabraria (Linnaeus, 1767)
Plagodis pulveraria (Linnaeus, 1758)
Plemyria rubiginata (Denis & Schiffermüller, 1775)
Pseudopanthera macularia (Linnaeus, 1758)
Pseudoterpna pruinata (Hufnagel, 1767)
Pterapherapteryx sexalata (Retzius, 1783)
Rheumaptera hastata (Linnaeus, 1758)
Rhodostrophia vibicaria (Clerck, 1759)
Scopula flaccidaria (Zeller, 1852)
Scopula floslactata (Haworth, 1809)
Scopula immutata (Linnaeus, 1758)
Scopula incanata (Linnaeus, 1758)
Scopula marginepunctata (Goeze, 1781)
Scopula ternata Schrank, 1802
Scopula caricaria (Reutti, 1853)
Scopula corrivalaria (Kretschmar, 1862)
Scopula decorata (Denis & Schiffermüller, 1775)
Scopula immorata (Linnaeus, 1758)
Scopula nemoraria (Hübner, 1799)
Scopula nigropunctata (Hufnagel, 1767)
Scopula ornata (Scopoli, 1763)
Scopula rubiginata (Hufnagel, 1767)
Scopula virgulata (Denis & Schiffermüller, 1775)
Scotopteryx chenopodiata (Linnaeus, 1758)
Scotopteryx luridata (Hufnagel, 1767)
Scotopteryx moeniata (Scopoli, 1763)
Scotopteryx mucronata (Scopoli, 1763)
Selenia dentaria (Fabricius, 1775)
Selenia lunularia (Hübner, 1788)
Selenia tetralunaria (Hufnagel, 1767)
Siona lineata (Scopoli, 1763)
Spargania luctuata (Denis & Schiffermüller, 1775)
Stegania cararia (Hübner, 1790)
Synopsia sociaria (Hübner, 1799)
Thalera fimbrialis (Scopoli, 1763)
Thera juniperata (Linnaeus, 1758)
Thera obeliscata (Hübner, 1787)
Thera variata (Denis & Schiffermüller, 1775)
Thetidia smaragdaria (Fabricius, 1787)
Timandra comae Schmidt, 1931
Trichopteryx carpinata (Borkhausen, 1794)
Venusia blomeri (Curtis, 1832)
Xanthorhoe biriviata (Borkhausen, 1794)
Xanthorhoe designata (Hufnagel, 1767)
Xanthorhoe ferrugata (Clerck, 1759)
Xanthorhoe fluctuata (Linnaeus, 1758)
Xanthorhoe montanata (Denis & Schiffermüller, 1775)
Xanthorhoe quadrifasiata (Clerck, 1759)
Xanthorhoe spadicearia (Denis & Schiffermüller, 1775)

Glyphipterigidae
Acrolepiopsis assectella (Zeller, 1839)
Glyphipterix forsterella (Fabricius, 1781)
Glyphipterix thrasonella (Scopoli, 1763)

Gracillariidae
Acrocercops brongniardella (Fabricius, 1798)
Callisto denticulella (Thunberg, 1794)
Callisto insperatella (Nickerl, 1864)
Caloptilia alchimiella (Scopoli, 1763)
Calybites phasianipennella (Hübner, 1813)
Gracillaria syringella (Fabricius, 1794)
Micrurapteryx kollariella (Zeller, 1839)
Parectopa ononidis (Zeller, 1839)
Parornix anglicella (Stainton, 1850)
Parornix betulae (Stainton, 1854)
Parornix devoniella (Stainton, 1850)
Parornix finitimella (Zeller, 1850)
Parornix scoticella (Stainton, 1850)
Parornix torquillella (Zeller, 1850)
Phyllonorycter acerifoliella (Zeller, 1839)
Phyllonorycter apparella (Herrich-Schäffer, 1855)
Phyllonorycter blancardella (Fabricius, 1781)
Phyllonorycter cerasicolella (Herrich-Schäffer, 1855)
Phyllonorycter coryli (Nicelli, 1851)
Phyllonorycter corylifoliella (Hübner, 1796)
Phyllonorycter emberizaepenella (Bouche, 1834)
Phyllonorycter insignitella (Zeller, 1846)
Phyllonorycter junoniella (Zeller, 1846)
Phyllonorycter klemannella (Fabricius, 1781)
Phyllonorycter kuhlweiniella (Zeller, 1839)
Phyllonorycter muelleriella (Zeller, 1839)
Phyllonorycter nicellii (Stainton, 1851)
Phyllonorycter nigrescentella (Logan, 1851)
Phyllonorycter oxyacanthae (Frey, 1856)
Phyllonorycter pastorella (Zeller, 1846)
Phyllonorycter populifoliella (Treitschke, 1833)
Phyllonorycter quercifoliella (Zeller, 1839)
Phyllonorycter rajella (Linnaeus, 1758)
Phyllonorycter sagitella (Bjerkander, 1790)
Phyllonorycter salicicolella (Sircom, 1848)
Phyllonorycter salictella (Zeller, 1846)
Phyllonorycter sorbi (Frey, 1855)
Phyllonorycter spinicolella (Zeller, 1846)
Phyllonorycter ulmifoliella (Hübner, 1817)

Heliozelidae
Heliozela sericiella (Haworth, 1828)

Hepialidae
Hepialus humuli (Linnaeus, 1758)
Pharmacis fusconebulosa (DeGeer, 1778)
Pharmacis lupulina (Linnaeus, 1758)
Phymatopus hecta (Linnaeus, 1758)
Triodia sylvina (Linnaeus, 1761)

Incurvariidae
Incurvaria masculella (Denis & Schiffermüller, 1775)
Incurvaria pectinea Haworth, 1828

Lasiocampidae
Cosmotriche lobulina (Denis & Schiffermüller, 1775)
Dendrolimus pini (Linnaeus, 1758)
Eriogaster lanestris (Linnaeus, 1758)
Euthrix potatoria (Linnaeus, 1758)
Gastropacha quercifolia (Linnaeus, 1758)
Gastropacha populifolia (Denis & Schiffermüller, 1775)
Lasiocampa quercus (Linnaeus, 1758)
Lasiocampa trifolii (Denis & Schiffermüller, 1775)
Macrothylacia rubi (Linnaeus, 1758)
Malacosoma castrensis (Linnaeus, 1758)
Malacosoma neustria (Linnaeus, 1758)
Odonestis pruni (Linnaeus, 1758)
Phyllodesma ilicifolia (Linnaeus, 1758)
Trichiura crataegi (Linnaeus, 1758)

Limacodidae
Apoda limacodes (Hufnagel, 1766)
Heterogenea asella (Denis & Schiffermüller, 1775)

Lyonetiidae
Leucoptera laburnella (Stainton, 1851)
Leucoptera lustratella (Herrich-Schäffer, 1855)
Leucoptera malifoliella (O. Costa, 1836)
Leucoptera sinuella (Reutti, 1853)
Leucoptera spartifoliella (Hübner, 1813)
Lyonetia clerkella (Linnaeus, 1758)
Lyonetia ledi Wocke, 1859
Lyonetia prunifoliella (Hübner, 1796)

Micropterigidae
Micropterix aruncella (Scopoli, 1763)
Micropterix aureatella (Scopoli, 1763)
Micropterix calthella (Linnaeus, 1761)

Momphidae
Mompha idaei (Zeller, 1839)
Mompha bradleyi Riedl, 1965
Mompha conturbatella (Hübner, 1819)
Mompha epilobiella (Denis & Schiffermüller, 1775)
Mompha sturnipennella (Treitschke, 1833)
Mompha subbistrigella (Haworth, 1828)
Mompha locupletella (Denis & Schiffermüller, 1775)
Mompha raschkiella (Zeller, 1839)

Nepticulidae
Ectoedemia argyropeza (Zeller, 1839)
Ectoedemia occultella (Linnaeus, 1767)
Ectoedemia turbidella (Zeller, 1848)
Ectoedemia decentella (Herrich-Schäffer, 1855)
Ectoedemia sericopeza (Zeller, 1839)
Stigmella incognitella (Herrich-Schäffer, 1855)
Stigmella luteella (Stainton, 1857)

Noctuidae
Abrostola asclepiadis (Denis & Schiffermüller, 1775)
Abrostola tripartita (Hufnagel, 1766)
Abrostola triplasia (Linnaeus, 1758)
Acontia trabealis (Scopoli, 1763)
Acronicta aceris (Linnaeus, 1758)
Acronicta leporina (Linnaeus, 1758)
Acronicta strigosa (Denis & Schiffermüller, 1775)
Acronicta alni (Linnaeus, 1767)
Acronicta cuspis (Hübner, 1813)
Acronicta psi (Linnaeus, 1758)
Acronicta tridens (Denis & Schiffermüller, 1775)
Acronicta auricoma (Denis & Schiffermüller, 1775)
Acronicta cinerea (Hufnagel, 1766)
Acronicta euphorbiae (Denis & Schiffermüller, 1775)
Acronicta menyanthidis (Esper, 1789)
Acronicta rumicis (Linnaeus, 1758)
Actinotia polyodon (Clerck, 1759)
Aedia funesta (Esper, 1786)
Agrochola lychnidis (Denis & Schiffermüller, 1775)
Agrochola helvola (Linnaeus, 1758)
Agrochola litura (Linnaeus, 1758)
Agrochola nitida (Denis & Schiffermüller, 1775)
Agrochola lota (Clerck, 1759)
Agrochola macilenta (Hübner, 1809)
Agrochola laevis (Hübner, 1803)
Agrochola circellaris (Hufnagel, 1766)
Agrotis bigramma (Esper, 1790)
Agrotis cinerea (Denis & Schiffermüller, 1775)
Agrotis clavis (Hufnagel, 1766)
Agrotis exclamationis (Linnaeus, 1758)
Agrotis ipsilon (Hufnagel, 1766)
Agrotis segetum (Denis & Schiffermüller, 1775)
Agrotis vestigialis (Hufnagel, 1766)
Allophyes oxyacanthae (Linnaeus, 1758)
Ammoconia caecimacula (Denis & Schiffermüller, 1775)
Amphipoea fucosa (Freyer, 1830)
Amphipoea lucens (Freyer, 1845)
Amphipoea oculea (Linnaeus, 1761)
Amphipyra berbera Rungs, 1949
Amphipyra livida (Denis & Schiffermüller, 1775)
Amphipyra perflua (Fabricius, 1787)
Amphipyra pyramidea (Linnaeus, 1758)
Amphipyra tragopoginis (Clerck, 1759)
Anarta myrtilli (Linnaeus, 1761)
Anarta dianthi (Tauscher, 1809)
Anarta trifolii (Hufnagel, 1766)
Anorthoa munda (Denis & Schiffermüller, 1775)
Antitype chi (Linnaeus, 1758)
Apamea anceps (Denis & Schiffermüller, 1775)
Apamea aquila Donzel, 1837
Apamea crenata (Hufnagel, 1766)
Apamea epomidion (Haworth, 1809)
Apamea furva (Denis & Schiffermüller, 1775)
Apamea illyria Freyer, 1846
Apamea lateritia (Hufnagel, 1766)
Apamea lithoxylaea (Denis & Schiffermüller, 1775)
Apamea monoglypha (Hufnagel, 1766)
Apamea oblonga (Haworth, 1809)
Apamea remissa (Hübner, 1809)
Apamea scolopacina (Esper, 1788)
Apamea sordens (Hufnagel, 1766)
Apamea sublustris (Esper, 1788)
Apamea unanimis (Hübner, 1813)
Aporophyla lutulenta (Denis & Schiffermüller, 1775)
Apterogenum ypsillon (Denis & Schiffermüller, 1775)
Archanara dissoluta (Treitschke, 1825)
Arenostola phragmitidis (Hübner, 1803)
Asteroscopus sphinx (Hufnagel, 1766)
Athetis pallustris (Hübner, 1808)
Atypha pulmonaris (Esper, 1790)
Autographa bractea (Denis & Schiffermüller, 1775)
Autographa buraetica (Staudinger, 1892)
Autographa gamma (Linnaeus, 1758)
Autographa jota (Linnaeus, 1758)
Autographa pulchrina (Haworth, 1809)
Axylia putris (Linnaeus, 1761)
Blepharita amica (Treitschke, 1825)
Brachionycha nubeculosa (Esper, 1785)
Brachylomia viminalis (Fabricius, 1776)
Bryophila ereptricula Treitschke, 1825
Bryophila raptricula (Denis & Schiffermüller, 1775)
Bryophila domestica (Hufnagel, 1766)
Calamia tridens (Hufnagel, 1766)
Callopistria juventina (Stoll, 1782)
Calophasia lunula (Hufnagel, 1766)
Caradrina morpheus (Hufnagel, 1766)
Caradrina clavipalpis Scopoli, 1763
Caradrina selini Boisduval, 1840
Celaena haworthii (Curtis, 1829)
Ceramica pisi (Linnaeus, 1758)
Cerapteryx graminis (Linnaeus, 1758)
Cerastis leucographa (Denis & Schiffermüller, 1775)
Cerastis rubricosa (Denis & Schiffermüller, 1775)
Charanyca trigrammica (Hufnagel, 1766)
Charanyca ferruginea (Esper, 1785)
Chersotis cuprea (Denis & Schiffermüller, 1775)
Chersotis transiens (Staudinger, 1897)
Chilodes maritima (Tauscher, 1806)
Chloantha hyperici (Denis & Schiffermüller, 1775)
Colocasia coryli (Linnaeus, 1758)
Conisania leineri (Freyer, 1836)
Conistra rubiginosa (Scopoli, 1763)
Conistra vaccinii (Linnaeus, 1761)
Conistra erythrocephala (Denis & Schiffermüller, 1775)
Conistra rubiginea (Denis & Schiffermüller, 1775)
Coranarta cordigera (Thunberg, 1788)
Cosmia trapezina (Linnaeus, 1758)
Cosmia diffinis (Linnaeus, 1767)
Cosmia pyralina (Denis & Schiffermüller, 1775)
Cosmia affinis (Linnaeus, 1767)
Craniophora ligustri (Denis & Schiffermüller, 1775)
Cryphia algae (Fabricius, 1775)
Crypsedra gemmea (Treitschke, 1825)
Cucullia absinthii (Linnaeus, 1761)
Cucullia artemisiae (Hufnagel, 1766)
Cucullia balsamitae Boisduval, 1840
Cucullia chamomillae (Denis & Schiffermüller, 1775)
Cucullia fraudatrix Eversmann, 1837
Cucullia praecana Eversmann, 1843
Cucullia umbratica (Linnaeus, 1758)
Cucullia lychnitis Rambur, 1833
Cucullia scrophulariae (Denis & Schiffermüller, 1775)
Cucullia verbasci (Linnaeus, 1758)
Dasypolia templi (Thunberg, 1792)
Deltote bankiana (Fabricius, 1775)
Deltote deceptoria (Scopoli, 1763)
Deltote uncula (Clerck, 1759)
Deltote pygarga (Hufnagel, 1766)
Denticucullus pygmina (Haworth, 1809)
Diachrysia chrysitis (Linnaeus, 1758)
Diachrysia stenochrysis (Warren, 1913)
Diarsia brunnea (Denis & Schiffermüller, 1775)
Diarsia dahlii (Hübner, 1813)
Diarsia mendica (Fabricius, 1775)
Diarsia rubi (Vieweg, 1790)
Dichagyris signifera (Denis & Schiffermüller, 1775)
Dicycla oo (Linnaeus, 1758)
Diloba caeruleocephala (Linnaeus, 1758)
Dryobotodes eremita (Fabricius, 1775)
Dypterygia scabriuscula (Linnaeus, 1758)
Elaphria venustula (Hübner, 1790)
Enargia paleacea (Esper, 1788)
Eremobia ochroleuca (Denis & Schiffermüller, 1775)
Euchalcia modestoides Poole, 1989
Euchalcia variabilis (Piller, 1783)
Eugnorisma depuncta (Linnaeus, 1761)
Euplexia lucipara (Linnaeus, 1758)
Eupsilia transversa (Hufnagel, 1766)
Eurois occulta (Linnaeus, 1758)
Euxoa aquilina (Denis & Schiffermüller, 1775)
Euxoa eruta (Hübner, 1817)
Euxoa nigricans (Linnaeus, 1761)
Euxoa obelisca (Denis & Schiffermüller, 1775)
Euxoa recussa (Hübner, 1817)
Globia algae (Esper, 1789)
Globia sparganii (Esper, 1790)
Graphiphora augur (Fabricius, 1775)
Griposia aprilina (Linnaeus, 1758)
Hada plebeja (Linnaeus, 1761)
Hadena perplexa (Denis & Schiffermüller, 1775)
Hadena compta (Denis & Schiffermüller, 1775)
Hadena confusa (Hufnagel, 1766)
Hadena filograna (Esper, 1788)
Hecatera bicolorata (Hufnagel, 1766)
Hecatera cappa (Hübner, 1809)
Heliothis maritima Graslin, 1855
Heliothis viriplaca (Hufnagel, 1766)
Helotropha leucostigma (Hübner, 1808)
Hoplodrina ambigua (Denis & Schiffermüller, 1775)
Hoplodrina blanda (Denis & Schiffermüller, 1775)
Hoplodrina octogenaria (Goeze, 1781)
Hydraecia micacea (Esper, 1789)
Hyppa rectilinea (Esper, 1788)
Ipimorpha contusa (Freyer, 1849)
Ipimorpha retusa (Linnaeus, 1761)
Ipimorpha subtusa (Denis & Schiffermüller, 1775)
Lacanobia contigua (Denis & Schiffermüller, 1775)
Lacanobia suasa (Denis & Schiffermüller, 1775)
Lacanobia thalassina (Hufnagel, 1766)
Lacanobia oleracea (Linnaeus, 1758)
Lacanobia w-latinum (Hufnagel, 1766)
Lamprotes c-aureum (Knoch, 1781)
Lasionycta imbecilla (Fabricius, 1794)
Lasionycta proxima (Hübner, 1809)
Lateroligia ophiogramma (Esper, 1794)
Lenisa geminipuncta (Haworth, 1809)
Leucania comma (Linnaeus, 1761)
Leucania obsoleta (Hübner, 1803)
Leucania putrescens (Hübner, 1824)
Lithophane consocia (Borkhausen, 1792)
Lithophane furcifera (Hufnagel, 1766)
Lithophane lamda (Fabricius, 1787)
Lithophane socia (Hufnagel, 1766)
Litoligia literosa (Haworth, 1809)
Luperina testacea (Denis & Schiffermüller, 1775)
Lycophotia porphyrea (Denis & Schiffermüller, 1775)
Macdunnoughia confusa (Stephens, 1850)
Mamestra brassicae (Linnaeus, 1758)
Melanchra persicariae (Linnaeus, 1761)
Mesapamea secalella Remm, 1983
Mesapamea secalis (Linnaeus, 1758)
Mesogona acetosellae (Denis & Schiffermüller, 1775)
Mesogona oxalina (Hübner, 1803)
Mesoligia furuncula (Denis & Schiffermüller, 1775)
Mniotype adusta (Esper, 1790)
Mniotype bathensis (Lutzau, 1901)
Mniotype satura (Denis & Schiffermüller, 1775)
Moma alpium (Osbeck, 1778)
Mythimna albipuncta (Denis & Schiffermüller, 1775)
Mythimna ferrago (Fabricius, 1787)
Mythimna l-album (Linnaeus, 1767)
Mythimna conigera (Denis & Schiffermüller, 1775)
Mythimna impura (Hübner, 1808)
Mythimna pallens (Linnaeus, 1758)
Mythimna straminea (Treitschke, 1825)
Naenia typica (Linnaeus, 1758)
Netrocerocora quadrangula (Eversmann, 1844)
Noctua fimbriata (Schreber, 1759)
Noctua janthina Denis & Schiffermüller, 1775
Noctua orbona (Hufnagel, 1766)
Noctua pronuba (Linnaeus, 1758)
Nonagria typhae (Thunberg, 1784)
Nyctobrya muralis (Forster, 1771)
Ochropleura plecta (Linnaeus, 1761)
Oligia fasciuncula (Haworth, 1809)
Oligia latruncula (Denis & Schiffermüller, 1775)
Oligia strigilis (Linnaeus, 1758)
Oligia versicolor (Borkhausen, 1792)
Opigena polygona (Denis & Schiffermüller, 1775)
Orthosia gracilis (Denis & Schiffermüller, 1775)
Orthosia opima (Hübner, 1809)
Orthosia cerasi (Fabricius, 1775)
Orthosia cruda (Denis & Schiffermüller, 1775)
Orthosia miniosa (Denis & Schiffermüller, 1775)
Orthosia populeti (Fabricius, 1775)
Orthosia incerta (Hufnagel, 1766)
Orthosia gothica (Linnaeus, 1758)
Oxicesta geographica (Fabricius, 1787)
Pachetra sagittigera (Hufnagel, 1766)
Panemeria tenebrata (Scopoli, 1763)
Panolis flammea (Denis & Schiffermüller, 1775)
Panthea coenobita (Esper, 1785)
Papestra biren (Goeze, 1781)
Paradiarsia punicea (Hübner, 1803)
Parastichtis suspecta (Hübner, 1817)
Peridroma saucia (Hübner, 1808)
Phlogophora meticulosa (Linnaeus, 1758)
Phlogophora scita (Hübner, 1790)
Photedes fluxa (Hübner, 1809)
Photedes minima (Haworth, 1809)
Plusia festucae (Linnaeus, 1758)
Plusia putnami (Grote, 1873)
Plusidia cheiranthi (Tauscher, 1809)
Polia bombycina (Hufnagel, 1766)
Polia hepatica (Clerck, 1759)
Polia nebulosa (Hufnagel, 1766)
Polychrysia moneta (Fabricius, 1787)
Polymixis trisignata (Menetries, 1847)
Protolampra sobrina (Duponchel, 1843)
Pseudeustrotia candidula (Denis & Schiffermüller, 1775)
Pyrrhia umbra (Hufnagel, 1766)
Rhizedra lutosa (Hübner, 1803)
Rhyacia simulans (Hufnagel, 1766)
Senta flammea (Curtis, 1828)
Sideridis rivularis (Fabricius, 1775)
Sideridis reticulata (Goeze, 1781)
Sideridis turbida (Esper, 1790)
Simyra albovenosa (Goeze, 1781)
Simyra nervosa (Denis & Schiffermüller, 1775)
Spaelotis ravida (Denis & Schiffermüller, 1775)
Subacronicta megacephala (Denis & Schiffermüller, 1775)
Syngrapha interrogationis (Linnaeus, 1758)
Syngrapha microgamma (Hübner, 1823)
Thalpophila matura (Hufnagel, 1766)
Tholera cespitis (Denis & Schiffermüller, 1775)
Tholera decimalis (Poda, 1761)
Tiliacea aurago (Denis & Schiffermüller, 1775)
Tiliacea citrago (Linnaeus, 1758)
Tiliacea sulphurago (Denis & Schiffermüller, 1775)
Trachea atriplicis (Linnaeus, 1758)
Trigonophora flammea (Esper, 1785)
Tyta luctuosa (Denis & Schiffermüller, 1775)
Xanthia gilvago (Denis & Schiffermüller, 1775)
Xanthia icteritia (Hufnagel, 1766)
Xanthia ocellaris (Borkhausen, 1792)
Xanthia togata (Esper, 1788)
Xestia c-nigrum (Linnaeus, 1758)
Xestia ditrapezium (Denis & Schiffermüller, 1775)
Xestia triangulum (Hufnagel, 1766)
Xestia speciosa (Hübner, 1813)
Xestia baja (Denis & Schiffermüller, 1775)
Xestia castanea (Esper, 1798)
Xestia stigmatica (Hübner, 1813)
Xestia xanthographa (Denis & Schiffermüller, 1775)
Xylena solidaginis (Hübner, 1803)
Xylena exsoleta (Linnaeus, 1758)
Xylena vetusta (Hübner, 1813)
Xylocampa areola (Esper, 1789)

Nolidae
Bena bicolorana (Fuessly, 1775)
Earias clorana (Linnaeus, 1761)
Earias insulana (Boisduval, 1833)
Earias vernana (Fabricius, 1787)
Meganola albula (Denis & Schiffermüller, 1775)
Meganola strigula (Denis & Schiffermüller, 1775)
Nola aerugula (Hübner, 1793)
Nola confusalis (Herrich-Schäffer, 1847)
Nola cucullatella (Linnaeus, 1758)
Nycteola degenerana (Hübner, 1799)
Nycteola revayana (Scopoli, 1772)
Pseudoips prasinana (Linnaeus, 1758)

Notodontidae
Cerura erminea (Esper, 1783)
Cerura vinula (Linnaeus, 1758)
Clostera anachoreta (Denis & Schiffermüller, 1775)
Clostera anastomosis (Linnaeus, 1758)
Clostera curtula (Linnaeus, 1758)
Clostera pigra (Hufnagel, 1766)
Drymonia dodonaea (Denis & Schiffermüller, 1775)
Drymonia ruficornis (Hufnagel, 1766)
Furcula bicuspis (Borkhausen, 1790)
Furcula bifida (Brahm, 1787)
Furcula furcula (Clerck, 1759)
Gluphisia crenata (Esper, 1785)
Harpyia milhauseri (Fabricius, 1775)
Leucodonta bicoloria (Denis & Schiffermüller, 1775)
Notodonta dromedarius (Linnaeus, 1767)
Notodonta torva (Hübner, 1803)
Notodonta tritophus (Denis & Schiffermüller, 1775)
Notodonta ziczac (Linnaeus, 1758)
Odontosia carmelita (Esper, 1799)
Odontosia sieversii (Menetries, 1856)
Peridea anceps (Goeze, 1781)
Phalera bucephala (Linnaeus, 1758)
Pheosia gnoma (Fabricius, 1776)
Pheosia tremula (Clerck, 1759)
Pterostoma palpina (Clerck, 1759)
Ptilodon capucina (Linnaeus, 1758)
Ptilophora plumigera (Denis & Schiffermüller, 1775)
Pygaera timon (Hübner, 1803)
Stauropus fagi (Linnaeus, 1758)

Oecophoridae
Bisigna procerella (Denis & Schiffermüller, 1775)
Borkhausenia luridicomella (Herrich-Schäffer, 1856)
Denisia similella (Hübner, 1796)
Denisia stipella (Linnaeus, 1758)
Endrosis sarcitrella (Linnaeus, 1758)
Epicallima formosella (Denis & Schiffermüller, 1775)
Harpella forficella (Scopoli, 1763)
Hofmannophila pseudospretella (Stainton, 1849)
Metalampra cinnamomea (Zeller, 1839)
Pleurota bicostella (Clerck, 1759)

Opostegidae
Opostega salaciella (Treitschke, 1833)

Peleopodidae
Carcina quercana (Fabricius, 1775)

Plutellidae
Plutella xylostella (Linnaeus, 1758)

Praydidae
Atemelia torquatella (Lienig & Zeller, 1846)
Prays fraxinella (Bjerkander, 1784)

Prodoxidae
Lampronia capitella (Clerck, 1759)
Lampronia corticella (Linnaeus, 1758)

Pterophoridae
Agdistis adactyla (Hübner, 1819)
Amblyptilia punctidactyla (Haworth, 1811)
Buckleria paludum (Zeller, 1839)
Emmelina monodactyla (Linnaeus, 1758)
Hellinsia didactylites (Strom, 1783)
Merrifieldia baliodactylus (Zeller, 1841)
Merrifieldia tridactyla (Linnaeus, 1758)
Oidaematophorus lithodactyla (Treitschke, 1833)
Oxyptilus chrysodactyla (Denis & Schiffermüller, 1775)
Oxyptilus parvidactyla (Haworth, 1811)
Platyptilia calodactyla (Denis & Schiffermüller, 1775)
Platyptilia tesseradactyla (Linnaeus, 1761)
Pterophorus pentadactyla (Linnaeus, 1758)
Stenoptilia pelidnodactyla (Stein, 1837)
Stenoptilia pterodactyla (Linnaeus, 1761)
Wheeleria obsoletus (Zeller, 1841)

Pyralidae
Homoeosoma inustella Ragonot, 1884
Hypsopygia costalis (Fabricius, 1775)
Hypsopygia glaucinalis (Linnaeus, 1758)
Plodia interpunctella (Hübner, 1813)
Pyralis regalis Denis & Schiffermüller, 1775
Synaphe punctalis (Fabricius, 1775)
Vitula biviella (Zeller, 1848)

Saturniidae
Aglia tau (Linnaeus, 1758)
Saturnia pavonia (Linnaeus, 1758)

Scythrididae
Parascythris muelleri (Mann, 1871)
Scythris apicalis (Zeller, 1847)
Scythris bifissella (O. Hofmann, 1889)
Scythris cicadella (Zeller, 1839)
Scythris clavella (Zeller, 1855)
Scythris cuspidella (Denis & Schiffermüller, 1775)
Scythris disparella (Tengstrom, 1848)
Scythris fuscoaenea (Haworth, 1828)
Scythris fuscopterella Bengtsson, 1977
Scythris inertella (Zeller, 1855)
Scythris laminella (Denis & Schiffermüller, 1775)
Scythris limbella (Fabricius, 1775)
Scythris palustris (Zeller, 1855)
Scythris picaepennis (Haworth, 1828)
Scythris podoliensis Rebel, 1938
Scythris productella (Zeller, 1839)
Scythris pudorinella (Moschler, 1866)
Scythris seliniella (Zeller, 1839)
Scythris setiella (Zeller, 1870)
Scythris sinensis (Felder & Rogenhofer, 1875)
Scythris subseliniella (Heinemann, 1876)

Sesiidae
Bembecia ichneumoniformis (Denis & Schiffermüller, 1775)
Chamaesphecia empiformis (Esper, 1783)
Paranthrene tabaniformis (Rottemburg, 1775)
Pennisetia hylaeiformis (Laspeyres, 1801)
Pyropteron muscaeformis (Esper, 1783)
Sesia apiformis (Clerck, 1759)
Sesia melanocephala Dalman, 1816
Synanthedon conopiformis (Esper, 1782)
Synanthedon culiciformis (Linnaeus, 1758)
Synanthedon formicaeformis (Esper, 1783)
Synanthedon myopaeformis (Borkhausen, 1789)
Synanthedon scoliaeformis (Borkhausen, 1789)
Synanthedon spheciformis (Denis & Schiffermüller, 1775)
Synanthedon tipuliformis (Clerck, 1759)
Synanthedon vespiformis (Linnaeus, 1761)

Sphingidae
Acherontia atropos (Linnaeus, 1758)
Agrius convolvuli (Linnaeus, 1758)
Daphnis nerii (Linnaeus, 1758)
Deilephila elpenor (Linnaeus, 1758)
Deilephila porcellus (Linnaeus, 1758)
Hemaris fuciformis (Linnaeus, 1758)
Hemaris tityus (Linnaeus, 1758)
Hyles euphorbiae (Linnaeus, 1758)
Hyles gallii (Rottemburg, 1775)
Hyles livornica (Esper, 1780)
Laothoe amurensis (Staudinger, 1879)
Laothoe populi (Linnaeus, 1758)
Macroglossum stellatarum (Linnaeus, 1758)
Marumba quercus (Denis & Schiffermüller, 1775)
Mimas tiliae (Linnaeus, 1758)
Proserpinus proserpina (Pallas, 1772)
Smerinthus ocellata (Linnaeus, 1758)
Sphinx ligustri Linnaeus, 1758
Sphinx pinastri Linnaeus, 1758

Stathmopodidae
Stathmopoda pedella (Linnaeus, 1761)

Tineidae
Archinemapogon yildizae Kocak, 1981
Elatobia fuliginosella (Lienig & Zeller, 1846)
Haplotinea ditella (Pierce & Metcalfe, 1938)
Haplotinea insectella (Fabricius, 1794)
Monopis imella (Hübner, 1813)
Monopis laevigella (Denis & Schiffermüller, 1775)
Monopis monachella (Hübner, 1796)
Monopis obviella (Denis & Schiffermüller, 1775)
Morophaga choragella (Denis & Schiffermüller, 1775)
Nemapogon cloacella (Haworth, 1828)
Nemapogon granella (Linnaeus, 1758)
Nemapogon nigralbella (Zeller, 1839)
Nemapogon picarella (Clerck, 1759)
Nemapogon quercicolella (Zeller, 1852)
Nemapogon variatella (Clemens, 1859)
Nemaxera betulinella (Fabricius, 1787)
Neurothaumasia ankerella (Mann, 1867)
Niditinea fuscella (Linnaeus, 1758)
Scardia boletella (Fabricius, 1794)
Tinea columbariella Wocke, 1877
Tinea nonimella (Zagulajev, 1955)
Tinea pellionella Linnaeus, 1758
Tinea trinotella Thunberg, 1794
Tineola bisselliella (Hummel, 1823)
Triaxomera fulvimitrella (Sodoffsky, 1830)
Triaxomera parasitella (Hübner, 1796)
Trichophaga tapetzella (Linnaeus, 1758)

Tischeriidae
Coptotriche angusticollella (Duponchel, 1843)
Coptotriche marginea (Haworth, 1828)
Tischeria decidua Wocke, 1876
Tischeria ekebladella (Bjerkander, 1795)

Tortricidae
Endothenia pullana (Haworth, 1811)

Yponomeutidae
Cedestis gysseleniella Zeller, 1839
Cedestis subfasciella (Stephens, 1834)
Euhyponomeuta stannella (Thunberg, 1788)
Ocnerostoma piniariella Zeller, 1847
Swammerdamia caesiella (Hübner, 1796)
Swammerdamia pyrella (Villers, 1789)
Yponomeuta cagnagella (Hübner, 1813)
Yponomeuta evonymella (Linnaeus, 1758)
Yponomeuta irrorella (Hübner, 1796)
Yponomeuta malinellus Zeller, 1838
Yponomeuta padella (Linnaeus, 1758)
Yponomeuta plumbella (Denis & Schiffermüller, 1775)
Yponomeuta rorrella (Hübner, 1796)

Ypsolophidae
Ochsenheimeria taurella (Denis & Schiffermüller, 1775)
Ochsenheimeria vacculella Fischer von Röslerstamm, 1842
Ypsolopha asperella (Linnaeus, 1761)
Ypsolopha dentella (Fabricius, 1775)
Ypsolopha falcella (Denis & Schiffermüller, 1775)
Ypsolopha mucronella (Scopoli, 1763)
Ypsolopha scabrella (Linnaeus, 1761)
Ypsolopha sequella (Clerck, 1759)

Zygaenidae
Adscita statices (Linnaeus, 1758)
Jordanita globulariae (Hübner, 1793)
Rhagades pruni (Denis & Schiffermüller, 1775)
Zygaena carniolica (Scopoli, 1763)
Zygaena cynarae (Esper, 1789)
Zygaena laeta (Hübner, 1790)
Zygaena minos (Denis & Schiffermüller, 1775)
Zygaena purpuralis (Brunnich, 1763)
Zygaena angelicae Ochsenheimer, 1808
Zygaena ephialtes (Linnaeus, 1767)
Zygaena filipendulae (Linnaeus, 1758)
Zygaena lonicerae (Scheven, 1777)
Zygaena loti (Denis & Schiffermüller, 1775)
Zygaena osterodensis Reiss, 1921
Zygaena viciae (Denis & Schiffermüller, 1775)

External links
Fauna Europaea

Belarus
Belarus
 Belarus
Lepidoptera